Éric Ruf (born 21 May 1969), is a French actor, set designer and theatre director. He appeared in more than thirty films since 1995.
He joined the Comédie-Française in 1993, became a member in 1998 and took the role of managing director in 2014.

Selected filmography

References

External links 

1969 births
Living people
French male film actors